Attaran Bridge is a bridge in the township of Mawlamyine, in the Mon State of Burma. It is suspended by steel cable with a reinforced concrete foundation. It is 1,420 feet long and 24 feet wide and was reported to have cost K 580.6 million. The bridge was established as part of infrastructural projects (Sittoung Bridge, Kataik Dam Project, etc.) to develop Mon State socio-economically.

Attaran Bridge was formally opened in March 1998 on the 53rd Anniversary Armed Forces Day, with an address by the chairman of the Work Committee for Development of Border Areas and National Races Secretary, Lieutenant General Khin Nyunt.

References

Bridges in Myanmar
Buildings and structures in Mon State